The Institute of Development Policy (IOB) is an independent institute of the University of Antwerp in Antwerp, Belgium. The institute is involved in academic teaching, scientific research and service to the community in the area of economic, political and social aspects of development policy and management.

The institute offers three master programs in Development Evaluation and Management, Governance and Development, and Globalisation and Development.

See also
 Royal Academy of Overseas Sciences
 Economic development
 International development

External links
 

University of Antwerp